Montagnes District is one of fourteen administrative districts of Ivory Coast. The district is located in the western part of the country, bordering Liberia and Guinea to the west, Woroba District to the north, Sassandra-Marahoué District to the east, and Bas-Sassandra District to the south. The capital of the district is Man.

Creation
Montagnes District was created in a 2011 administrative reorganisation of the subdivisions of Ivory Coast. The territory of the district was composed by merging the former regions of Dix-Huit Montagnes and Moyen-Cavally.

Geography

N'zo Partial Faunal Reserve

Administrative divisions
Montagnes District was subdivided into three regions and the following departments:
 Cavally Region (region seat in Guiglo)
 Bloléquin Department
 Guiglo Department
 Toulépleu Department
 Taï Department
 Guémon Region (region seat in Duékoué)
 Bangolo Department
 Duékoué Department
 Kouibly Department
 Facobly Department
 Tonkpi Region (region seat also in Man)
 Biankouma Department
 Danané Department
 Man Department
 Zouan-Hounien Department
 Sipilou Department

Population
According to the 2021 census, Montagnes District has a population of 3,027,023, making it the second most populous district in Ivory Coast, behind only Abidjan Autonomous District.

References

 
Districts of Ivory Coast
States and territories established in 2011